Ronald Turnbull Mark,  (born 1898, date of death unknown) was a British flying ace of the First World War who was credited with 14 aerial victories.

First World War
Mark joined the Royal Flying Corps as a temporary second lieutenant (on probation), and was confirmed in his rank on 20 October 1917. In January 1918 he was posted to No. 24 Squadron on the Western Front to fly the SE.5a single-seat fighter.

His first aerial victory came at 0830 hours on 18 February 1918, when Mark, Horace Barton and Andrew Cowper drove a German DFW two-seater reconnaissance aircraft down out of control. He scored his second win later that same day, driving a Pfalz D.III fighter down out of control. The next morning, ten minutes combat saw Mark help Cowper, Reuben Hammersley, and Peter MacDougall burn another DFW reconnaissance aircraft and destroy a Rumpler two-seater. On the 26th, Mark shared with Ian Donald Roy McDonald, Herbert Richardson, and four other British pilots in the destruction of a new Fokker Dr.I triplane fighter. Mark was now an ace. By checking internal evidence to Mark's victory list, these seem to have been the days described in the citation for his first Military Cross:

On 11 March, Mark, Herbert Richardson, Alfred John Brown, and two other pilots drove down a two-seater. Two days later, Mark repeated the feat, but single-handed. Two days after that, he teamed with Richardson and Cowper to destroy an observation aircraft. By 3 May, he had run his string to 14, sharing a victory each with Conway Farrell and Cyril Lowe. On 21 May, he took off on the sortie described in his citation for a second award of the Military Cross:

Unmentioned is the finale; Mark's crash landing of his damaged aircraft set it afire. Somehow he survived unscathed. Mark was appointed a temporary captain on 1 September 1918, and eventually left the RAF, relinquishing his commission on 9 April 1919.

Second World War and beyond
On 2 April 1940, Mark was granted a commission in the Royal Air Force Volunteer Reserve as a pilot officer on probation "for the duration of hostilities". Exactly one year later, he was confirmed in his rank. On 9 February 1941 he was granted the war substantive rank of flying officer, and was promoted to squadron leader in the Administrative and Special Duties Branch on 1 October 1943. By 1 January 1945, when Mark received a mentioned in despatches and was made an Officer of the Order of the British Empire, he held the acting rank of wing commander.

Post-war Mark pursued a career as in business. On 28 May 1948 Ronald Turnbull Mark, Mrs. Elsie Brooks and William Stanley Rainbow bought William Bell Rope and Twine Merchants in Edinburgh, and Mark was the chairman of the Forster Tobacco Company Ltd. of Newcastle upon Tyne, when it was sold in February 1956.

References
Citations

Bibliography
 

1898 births
Year of death missing
Military personnel from Newcastle upon Tyne
Royal Flying Corps officers
Royal Air Force personnel of World War I
British World War I flying aces
Recipients of the Military Cross
Royal Air Force Volunteer Reserve personnel of World War II
Officers of the Order of the British Empire
Royal Air Force wing commanders